Lipovice (Cyrillic: Липовице) is a village in the municipality of Kalesija, Bosnia and Herzegovina. In Lipovice lives 1158 residents. Residents are engaged mainly in primary production and agriculture. The most important building in the village is "Lipovacka Dzamija" (mosque).

Demographics 
According to the 2013 census, its population was 1,158.

References

Populated places in Kalesija